Alan Kevin Farell Cuéllar (born 27 March 1996) is a Bolivian footballer who plays for Real Santa Cruz as an attacking midfielder.

Club career
Born in Santa Cruz de la Sierra, Farell was an Academía Tahuichi youth graduate. After making his senior debut with hometown's Club Florida, he moved to Callejas in 2014.

Farell joined LFPB side Blooming on 5 February 2016, initially on loan until June. He made his debut for the club on 7 May, coming on as a late substitute for Didí Torrico in a 2–0 away loss against Nacional Potosí.

Bought outright ahead of the 2016–17 season, Farell was made a starter by manager Mauricio Soria. He scored his first professional goal on 16 October 2016, netting the third in a 4–0 away routing of Guabirá.

International career
On 4 November 2016, Farell was called up by Bolivia national team manager Ángel Hoyos for two 2018 FIFA World Cup qualification matches against Venezuela and Paraguay. However, he remained unused in both matches.

References

External links

1996 births
Living people
Sportspeople from Santa Cruz de la Sierra
Bolivian footballers
Association football midfielders
Bolivian Primera División players
Club Blooming players
Real Santa Cruz players